S. Barry Cooper (9 October 1943 – 26 October 2015) was an English mathematician and computability theorist. He was a professor of Pure Mathematics at the University of Leeds.

Early life and education
Cooper grew up in Bognor Regis and attended Chichester High School for Boys, during which time he played scrum-half for the under-15s England rugby team.

Cooper graduated from Jesus College, Oxford in 1966 and in 1970 received his PhD from the University of Leicester under the supervision of Reuben Goodstein and C.E.M. Yates, with a thesis entitled Degrees of Unsolvability.

Academic career
Cooper was appointed Lecturer in the School of Mathematics at the University of Leeds in 1969, where he remained for the rest of his career.  He was promoted to Reader in Mathematical Logic in 1991 and to Professor of Pure Mathematics in 1996. In 2011, he was awarded an honorary doctorate at the University of Sofia "St. Kliment Ohridski".

His book Computability Theory made the technical research area accessible to a new generation of students.  He was a leading mover of the return to basic questions of the kind considered by Alan Turing, and of interdisciplinary developments related to computability. He was President of the Association Computability in Europe, and Chair of the Turing Centenary Advisory Committee (TCAC), which co-ordinated the Alan Turing Year. The book Alan Turing: His Work and Impact, edited by Cooper and Jan van Leeuwen, won the Association of American Publishers' R. R. Hawkins Award.

Cooper was a member of the editorial board for The Rutherford Journal.

Interests
Cooper was a keen long-distance runner, and was also interested in jazz and improvised music, founding Leeds Jazz and being involved in the Termite Club.

In the 1970s, he was also a leading figure in the Chile Solidarity Campaign, welcoming Chilean refugees to Leeds.

Death
Cooper died on 26 October 2015 after a short illness.

Selected publications
 S. B. Cooper, 2004. Computability Theory, Chapman & Hall/CRC. 
 S. B. Cooper; J. van Leeuwen (eds.), 2013. Alan Turing – His Work and Impact, New York: Elsevier, 
 S. B. Cooper, B. Löwe, A. Sorbi (eds.), 2008. New Computational Paradigms – Changing Conceptions of What is Computable, Springer.

References

External links
S. Barry Cooper homepage
S. Barry Cooper's Mathematics Genealogy Page
Computability in Europe homepage
The Alan Turing Centenary homepage

1943 births
2015 deaths
English logicians
20th-century British mathematicians
20th-century English mathematicians
21st-century British mathematicians
21st-century English mathematicians
Alumni of Jesus College, Oxford
Alumni of the University of Leicester
Academics of the University of Leeds
English philosophers